Salem Community College (SCC) is a public community college  in Salem County, New Jersey. Salem Community College's main  campus is in Carneys Point Township. SCC is authorized to grant associate degrees, including Associate in Arts, Associate in Fine Arts, Associate in Science, and Associate in Applied Science certificates. SCC also offers the only degree program in the US for scientific glassblowing.

Salem Community College was founded as Salem County Technical Institute in 1958. Recognizing the college-level caliber of the institute's programs, the Salem County Board of Chosen Freeholders requested approval to grant degree-awarding authority to the institute. The New Jersey Commission on Higher Education evaluated the institute's programs and granted the requested approval. On September 3, 1972, Salem Community College was established.  It is accredited by the Middle States Commission on Higher Education.

Notable alumni
 Evan Edinger (born 1990), American-born YouTuber based in London

See also

New Jersey County Colleges
Lampworking

References

External links

Official website
 - Main campus
 - Salem Center

1958 establishments in New Jersey
Carneys Point Township, New Jersey
Educational institutions established in 1958
Garden State Athletic Conference
Glassmaking schools
New Jersey County Colleges
NJCAA athletics
Two-year colleges in the United States
Universities and colleges in Salem County, New Jersey